In chess, a fork is a tactic in which a piece  multiple enemy pieces simultaneously. The attacker usually aims to capture one of the forked pieces. The defender often cannot counter every threat. A fork is most effective when it is forcing, such as when the king is put in check.

Terminology 
The type of fork is named after the type of forking piece. For example, a fork by a knight is a knight fork. The attacked pieces are forked. If the King is one of the attacked pieces, the term absolute fork is sometimes used. A fork not involving the enemy king is in contrast a relative fork.

A fork of the king and queen, the highest material-gaining fork possible, is sometimes called a royal fork. A fork of the enemy king, queen, and one (or both) rooks is sometimes called a grand fork. A knight fork of the enemy king, queen, and possibly other pieces is sometimes called a family fork or family check.

Strategy
Any piece can deliver a fork. Forks are most often delivered by knights: a knight is not attacked by a piece it attacks except for an enemy knight, and it can be exchanged for a more valuable piece.

Since the queen is usually more valuable than the pieces it attacks, a queen fork gains material only when the pieces attacked are undefended or if one of them is the king and the other is undefended, and the other piece cannot capture the queen by itself.

Game examples

This example is from the first round of the FIDE World Chess Championship 2004 between Mohamed Tissir and Alexey Dreev.  After 

33... Nf2+ 34. Kg1 Nd3

White resigned. In the final position the black knight forks White's queen and rook; after the queen moves away, Black will win the exchange.

This example is from the ninth round of the Clarin GP Final between Guillermo Soppe and Fernando Braga.  After 

40... Qh1+

White resigned. The only move is 41.Ke2 which enables a royal fork with 41...Nc3+, winning the queen.

In the Two Knights Defense (1.e4 e5 2.Nf3 Nc6 3.Bc4 Nf6) after 4.Nc3, Black can eliminate White's e4-pawn immediately with 
4... Nxe4 

due to the fork trick 
5. Nxe4 d5

regaining either the bishop or the knight.

References

Further reading

Chess tactics
Chess terminology